Maciej Gostomski (born 27 September 1988) is a Polish professional footballer who plays as a goalkeeper who plays for Górnik Łęczna.

Career
Gostomski was born in Kartuzy. At Legia Warsaw he was the third-choice goalkeeper behind Ján Mucha and Wojciech Skaba and played primarily for Młoda Ekstraklasa. He fell out of favour after a series of photos were leaked to the media of him smoking and throwing a pineapple at an apartment window.

He had a series of short spells at various clubs, including Bałtyk Gdynia which he joined on a one-year contract in February 2011. He became a part-time player, working also as a fisherman. His fortunes changed at Bytovia Bytów, with the club rising through the leagues, before joining Lech Poznań.

On 3 January 2016, he signed a six-month contract with Scottish side Rangers. Gostomski became Warburton's second signing of the 2016 January transfer window. In March 2016, was released from his contract at Rangers just over two months after joining the club.

Gostomski signed for Korona Kielce on 9 June 2016.

On 11 August 2020, he signed a one-year deal with Górnik Łęczna.

Career statistics

Club

Honours

Club
Lech Poznań
 Ekstraklasa: 2014–15
 Polish Super Cup: 2015

References

External links
 

1988 births
People from Kartuzy
Sportspeople from Pomeranian Voivodeship
Living people
Polish footballers
Association football goalkeepers
Legia Warsaw players
Zagłębie Sosnowiec players
Odra Wodzisław Śląski players
Bałtyk Gdynia players
Bytovia Bytów players
Lech Poznań II players
Lech Poznań players
Rangers F.C. players
Korona Kielce players
Chojniczanka Chojnice players
MKS Cracovia (football) players
FK Haugesund players
Górnik Łęczna players
Ekstraklasa players
I liga players
II liga players
III liga players
Polish expatriate footballers
Expatriate footballers in Scotland
Polish expatriate sportspeople in Scotland
Expatriate footballers in Norway
Polish expatriate sportspeople in Norway